West Ham Garfield Football Club was a football club based in West Ham, England.

History
West Ham Garfield was formed in 1894. After their formation, the club joined the South Essex League. In 1897, West Ham Garfield won the West Ham Charity Cup, beating Thames Ironworks 1–0 in the final. The following year, the club won the competition for a second time, beating Ilford 1–0. In 1900, West Ham Garfield entered the FA Cup for the first time, beating Leyton in the preliminary round after a replay. Following the 1907–08 season, West Ham Garfield dissolved.

Ground
Despite being from West Ham, on 6 October 1900, playing in the FA Cup first qualifying round against Olympic, West Ham Garfield used Ilford Sports Ground as their home venue.

Records
Best FA Cup performance: First qualifying round, 1900–01

References

South Essex League
Defunct football clubs in London
Sport in the London Borough of Newham
Association football clubs established in 1894
1894 establishments in England
Association football clubs disestablished in 1908
1908 disestablishments in England